Kera is a station on the Helsinki commuter rail network located in Karamalmi, a district of the city of Espoo in Finland. It is situated between stations Kilo railway station and Kauniainen railway station.

History
The station is named after a ceramics factory, which took in clay from a nearby field. The factory's names have included:
 Viherlaakson kattotiili OY
 Saviteollisuus OY
 Grankullan Saviteollisuus OY
 Kera OY (from 1936)

The factory's products have included flower pots, Finnish rooster-whistles, pans, trays, tea pots, ash trays and air moisturisers. Particular attention was paid to the usability and stackability of the items.

The factory's business ended in 1958 because of large fires, foreign import of cheap ceramics, the introduction of plastic, and the rise of Arabia as the largest ceramics factory in the Helsinki conurbation.

References 

Railway stations in Espoo